The 2014 Chicago Cubs season was the 143rd season of the franchise, the 139th in the National League and the 99th at Wrigley Field. The Cubs were managed by Rick Renteria in his only year as Cubs manager and played their home games at Wrigley Field as members of the National League Central Division.

The Cubs began the season on the road against the Pittsburgh Pirates on March 31, 2014 and finished the regular season on September 28, 2014, on the road against the Milwaukee Brewers. 

The Cubs finished the season with a 73–89 record to finish in last place in the Central Division.

This season marked the 100th season of play at Wrigley Field, though the Cubs did not start playing there until 1916. To mark the occasion, the Cubs wore different uniforms to represent each decade during ten homestands throughout the season.

Previous season 
The Cubs finished the 2013 season 66–96 to finish in last place in the Central Division. Following the season, Dale Sveum was fired as manager on September 30, 2013. His total record with the Cubs in two years was 127–197. Rick Renteria was hired as the manager of the Chicago Cubs on November 7, 2013 and signed a three-year contract.

Offseason

Spring training facilities
The Cubs opened a new spring training facility in Mesa, Arizona called Sloan Park. The park replaces HoHoKam Stadium which had been their spring training home since 1979.  With a capacity of 15,000, Cubs Park becomes the largest spring training stadium by capacity in Major League Baseball, surpassing Camelback Ranch in Glendale.

Regular season

Opening day starters
Monday, March 31, 2014 at Pittsburgh Pirates

Season standings

National League Central

National League Wild Card

Record vs. opponents

Detailed record vs. opponents

Game log

|- style="text-align:center; background:#fbb;"
| 1
| March 31
| @ Pirates
| L 0–1 (10)
| Morris (1–0)
| Villanueva (0–1)
| 
| 39,833
| 0–1
|-

|- style="text-align:center; background:#fbb;"
| 2
| April 2
| @ Pirates
| L 3–4 (16)
| Pimentel (1–0)
| Villanueva (0–2)
| 
| 29,762
| 0–2
|- style="text-align:center; background:#bfb"
| 3
| April 3
| @ Pirates
| W 3–2
| Hammel (1–0)
| Rodríguez (0–1)
| Strop (1)
| 11,418
| 1–2
|- style="text-align:center; background:#fbb;"
| 4
| April 4
| Phillies
| L 2–7
| Hernández (1–0)
| Wood (0–1)
| 
| 38,283
| 1–3
|- style="text-align:center; background:#fbb;"
| 5
| April 5
| Phillies
| L 0–2
| Lee (2–0)
| Samardzija (0–1)
| Papelbon (1)
| 30,651
| 1–4
|- style="text-align:center; background:#bfb"
| 6
| April 6
| Phillies
| W 8–3
| Villanueva (1–2)
| Burnett (0–1)
| 
| 26,712
| 2–4
|- style="text-align:center; background:#fbb;"
| 7
| April 8
| Pirates
| L 6–7
| Watson (2–0)
| Strop (0–1)
| Grilli (2)
| 26,177
| 2–5
|- style="text-align:center; background:#bfb"
| 8
| April 9
| Pirates
| W 7–5
| Hammel (2–0)
| Rodríguez (0–2)
| 
| 28,247
| 3–5
|- style="text-align:center; background:#fbb;"
| 9
| April 10
| Pirates
| L 4–5
| Cole (2–0)
| Russell (0–1)
| Grilli (3)
| 25,502
| 3–6
|- style="text-align:center; background:#bfb"
| 10
| April 11
| @ Cardinals
| W 6–3
| Grimm (1–0)
| Rosenthal (0–1)
| Rondón (1)
| 43,903
| 4–6
|- style="text-align:center; background:#fbb;"
| 11
| April 12
| @ Cardinals
| L 4–10
| Wainwright (2–1)
| Villanueva (1–3)
| 
| 45,302
| 4–7
|- style="text-align:center; background:#fbb;"
| 12
| April 13
| @ Cardinals
| L 4–6
| Wacha (2–0)
| Jackson (0–1)
| Rosenthal (4)
| 44,135
| 4–8
|- style="text-align:center; background:#bbb;"
| —
| April 15
| @ Yankees
| colspan="6" | Postponed (inclement weather) (Makeup date: April 16)
|- style="text-align:center; background:#fbb;"
| 13
| April 16
| @ Yankees
| L 0–3
| Tanaka (2–0)
| Hammel (2–1)
| Kelley (4)
| 36,569
| 4–9
|- style="text-align:center; background:#fbb;"
| 14
| April 16
| @ Yankees
| L 0–2
| Pineda (2–1)
| Wood (0–2)
| Warren (1)
| 40,073
| 4–10
|- style="text-align:center; background:#fbb;"
| 15
| April 18
| Reds
| L 1–4
| Simón (2–1)
| Samardzija (0–2)
| Broxton (2)
| 28,699
| 4–11
|- style="text-align:center; background:#bfb;"
| 16
| April 19
| Reds
| W 8–4
| Jackson (1–1)
| Cingrani (1–2)
| 
| 32,966
| 5–11
|- style="text-align:center; background:#fbb;"
| 17
| April 20
| Reds
| L 2–8
| Bailey (1–1)
| Villanueva (1–4)
| 
| 27,927
| 5–12 
|- style="text-align:center; background:#bfb;"
| 18
| April 21
| Diamondbacks
| W 5–1
| Wood (1–2)
| Arroyo (1–2)
| 
| 32,439
| 6–12
|- style="text-align:center; background:#bfb;"
| 19
| April 22
| Diamondbacks
| W 9–2
| Hammel (3–1)
| McCarthy (0–4)
| 
| 35,381
| 7–12 
|- style="text-align:center; background:#fbb;"
| 20
| April 23
| Diamondbacks
| L 5–7
| Cahill (1–4)
| Strop (0–2)
| Reed (4)
| 32,323
| 7–13
|- style="text-align:center; background:#fbb;"
| 21
| April 24
| Diamondbacks
| L 2–5
| Bolsinger (1–1)
| Jackson (1–2)
| Reed (5)
| 33,085
| 7–14
|- style="text-align:center; background:#fbb;"
| 22
| April 25
| @ Brewers
| L 2–5
| Garza (1–2)
| Villanueva (1–5)
| Rodríguez (10)
| 32,868
| 7–15
|- style="text-align:center; background:#fbb;"
| 23
| April 26
| @ Brewers
| L 3–5
| Estrada (2–1)
| Wood (1–3)
| Rodríguez (11)
| 40,008
| 7–16
|- style="text-align:center; background:#bfb;"
| 24
| April 27
| @ Brewers
| W 4–0
| Hammel (4–1)
| Peralta (3–1)
| 
| 45,286
| 8–16
|- style="text-align:center; background:#bbb;"
| —
| April 28
| @ Reds
| colspan="6" | Postponed (inclement weather) (Makeup date: July 8) 
|- style="text-align:center; background:#fbb;"
| 25
| April 29
| @ Reds
| L 2–3
| Simón (4–1)
| Samardzija (0–3)
| Broxton (5)
| 17,579
| 8–17 
|- style="text-align:center; background:#bfb;"
| 26
| April 30
| @ Reds
| W 9–4
| Jackson (2–2)
| Christiani (0–1)
| 
| 21,847
| 9–17
|-

|- style="text-align:center; background:#bfb;"
| 27
| May 2
| Cardinals
| W 6–5
| Wood (2–3)
| Wainwright (5–2)
| Rondón (2)
| 28,160
| 10–17
|- style="text-align:center; background:#bfb;"
| 28
| May 3
| Cardinals
| W 3–0
| Schlitter (1–0)
| Wacha (2–3)
| Rondón (3)
| 37,874
| 11–17
|- style="text-align:center; background:#fbb;"
| 29
| May 4
| Cardinals
| L 4–5
| Siegrist (1–1)
| Rondón (0–1)
| Rosenthal (8)
| 30,023
| 11–18
|- style="text-align:center; background:#fbb;"
| 30
| May 5
| White Sox
| L 1–3 (12)
| Webb (3–0)
| Grimm (1–1)
| Lindstrom (5)
| 33,146
| 11–19
|- style="text-align:center; background:#fbb;"
| 31
| May 6
| White Sox
| L 1–5
| Putnam (1–0)
| Ramirez (0–1)
| 
| 34,305
| 11–20
|- style="text-align:center; background:#fbb;"
| 32
| May 7
| @ White Sox
| L 3–8
| Danks (3–2)
| Wood (2–4)
| 
| 21,075
| 11–21
|- style="text-align:center; background:#bfb;"
| 33
| May 8
| @ White Sox
| W 12–5
| Schlitter (2–0)
| Carroll (1–2)
| 
| 26,332
| 12–21
|- style="text-align:center; background:#fbb;"
| 34
| May 9
| @ Braves
| L 2–3 (10)
| Wood (3–5)
| Wright (0–1)
| 
| 27,145
| 12–22
|- style="text-align:center; background:#fbb;"
| 35
| May 10
| @ Braves
| L 0–2
| Santana (4–0)
| Schlitter (2–1)
| Kimbrel (10)
| 30,658
| 12–23
|- style="text-align:center; background:#fbb; "
| 36
| May 11
| @ Braves
| L 2–5
| Harang (4–3)
| Jackson (2–3)
| Carpenter (2)
| 26,151
| 12–24
|- style="text-align:center; background:#bfb;"
| 37
| May 12
| @ Cardinals
| W 17–5
| Wood (3–4)
| Lyons (0–3)
| 
| 44,434
| 13–24
|- style="text-align:center; background:#fbb;"
| 38
| May 13
| @ Cardinals
| L 3–4 (12)
| Maness (1–2)
| Grimm (1–2)
| 
| 43,627
| 13–25
|- style="text-align:center; background:#bbb;"
| —
| May 14
| @ Cardinals
| colspan="6" | Postponed (inclement weather) (Makeup date: August 30)
|- style="text-align:center; background:#fbb;"
| 39
| May 15
| @ Cardinals
| L 3–5
| Wacha (3–3)
| Hammel (4–2)
| Rosenthal (11)
| 42,501
| 13–26
|- style="text-align:center; background:#fbb;"
| 40
| May 16
| Brewers
| L 3–4
| Lohse (5–1)
| Samardzija (0–4)
| Rodríguez (17)
| 35,771
| 13–27
|- style="text-align:center; background:#bfb;"
| 41
| May 17
| Brewers
| W 3–0
| Jackson (3–3)
| Garza (2–4)
| Rondón (4)
| 36,671
| 14–27
|- style="text-align:center; background:#bfb;"
| 42
| May 18
| Brewers
| W 4–2
| Wood (4–4)
| Estrada (3–2)
| Rondón (5)
| 37,631
| 15–27
|- style="text-align:center; background:#bfb;"
| 43
| May 20
| Yankees
| W 6–1
| Hammel (5–2)
| Tanaka (6–1)
| 
| 38,753
| 16–27
|- style="text-align:center; background:#fbb;"
| 44
| May 21
| Yankees
| L 2–4 (13)
| Claiborne (2–0)
| Veras (0–1)
| Robertson (9)
| 34,808
| 16–28
|- style="text-align:center; background:#bfb;"
| 45
| May 22
| @ Padres
| W 5–1
| Arrieta (1–0)
| Stults (2–5)
| Villanueva (1)
| 21,263
| 17–28
|- style="text-align:center; background:#fbb;"
| 46
| May 23
| @ Padres
| L 1–11
| Stauffer (2–0)
| Jackson (3–4)
| 
| 26,489
| 17–29
|- style="text-align:center; background:#bfb;"
| 47
| May 24
| @ Padres
| W 3–2
| Wood (5–4)
| Buckner (0–1)
| Rondón (6)
| 42,107
| 18–29
|- style="text-align:center; background:#fbb;"
| 48
| May 25
| @ Padres
| L 3–4
| Kennedy (3–6)
| Hammel (5–3)
| Street (14)
| 32,167
| 18–30
|- style="text-align:center; background:#bfb;"
| 49
| May 26
| @ Giants
| W 8–4
| Samardzija (1–4)
| Petit (3–2)
| 
| 42,257
| 19–30
|- style="text-align:center; background:#fbb;"
| 50
| May 27
| @ Giants
| L 0–4
| Hudson (5–2)
| Arrieta (1–1)
| 
| 41,060
| 19–31
|- style="text-align:center; background:#fbb;"
| 51
| May 28
| @ Giants
| L 0–5
| Kontos (1–0)
| Jackson (3–5)
| 
| 41,186
| 19–32
|- style="text-align:center; background:#fbb;"
| 52
| May 30
| @ Brewers
| L 5–11
| Estrada (5–2)
| Wood (5–5)
| 
| 36,100
| 19–33
|- style="text-align:center; background:#bfb;"
| 53
| May 31
| @ Brewers
| W 8-0
| Hammel (6–3)
| Peralta (4–5)
| 
| 42,332
| 20–33
|-

|- style="text-align:center; background:#fbb;"
| 54
| June 1
| @ Brewers
| L 0–9
| Lohse (7–1)
| Samardzija (1–5)
| 
| 36,277
| 20–34
|- style="text-align:center; background:#bfb;"
| 55
| June 3
| Mets
| W 2–1
| Rondón (1–1)
| Rice (1–2)
| 
| 34,697
| 21–34
|- style="text-align:center; background:#bfb;"
| 56
| June 4
| Mets
| W 5–4
| Jackson (4–5)
| Eveland (0–1)
| Rondón (7)
| 28,185
| 22–34
|- style="text-align:center; background:#bfb;"
| 57
| June 5
| Mets
| W 7–4
| Grimm (2–2)
| Black (1–1)
| Ramirez (1)
| 28,833
| 23–34
|- style="text-align:center; background:#bfb;"
| 58
| June 6
| Marlins
| W 5–3 (13)
| Villanueva (2–5)
| Slowey (1–1)
| 
| 28,495
| 24–34
|- style="text-align:center; background:#bfb;"
| 59
| June 7
| Marlins
| W 5–2
| Samardzija (2–5)
| Wolf (1–2)
| Strop (2)
| 33,786
| 25–34
|- style="text-align:center; background:#fbb;"
| 60
| June 8
| Marlins
| L 3–4
| Dunn (5–3)
| Strop (0–3)
| Cishek (14)
| 33,134
| 25–35
|- style="text-align:center; background:#fbb;"
| 61
| June 9
| @ Pirates
| L 2–6
| Morton (3–7)
| Jackson (4–6)
| 
| 24,075
| 25–36
|- style="text-align:center; background:#bfb;"
| 62
| June 10
| @ Pirates
| W 7–3
|  Wood (6–5)
| Sadler (0–1)
| 
| 31,567
| 26–36
|- style="text-align:center; background:#fbb;"
| 63
| June 11
| @ Pirates
| L 2–4
| Cumpton (2–2)
| Hammel (6–4)
| Grilli (10)
| 20,540
| 26–37
|- style="text-align:center; background:#fbb;"
| 64
| June 12
| @ Pirates
| L 0–4
| Vólquez (4–5)
| Samardzija (2–6)
| 
| 25,431
| 26–38
|- style="text-align:center; background:#bfb;"
| 65
| June 13
| @ Phillies
| W 2–1
| Arrieta (2–1)
| Hernández (2–5)
| Ramirez (2)
| 26,154
| 27–38
|- style="text-align:center; background:#fbb;"
| 66
| June 14
| @ Phillies
| L 4–7
| Buchanan (2–3)
| Jackson (4–7)
| Papelbon (15)
| 31,524
| 27–39
|- style="text-align:center; background:#bfb;"
| 67
| June 15
| @ Phillies
| W 3–0
| Wood (7–5)
| Burnett (4–6)
| Ramirez (3)
| 41,238
| 28–39
|- style="text-align:center; background:#bfb;"
| 68
| June 16
| @ Marlins
| W 5–4
| Villanueva (3–5)
| Turner (2–5)
| Russell (1)
| 19,170
| 29–39
|- style="text-align:center; background:#fbb;"
| 69
| June 17
| @ Marlins
| L 5–6
| Dyson (1–0)
| Schlitter (2–2)
| Cishek (16)
| 20,860
| 29–40
|- style="text-align:center; background:#bfb;"
| 70
| June 18
| @ Marlins
| W 6–1
| Arrieta (3–1)
| Eovaldi (4–3)
| 
| 27,032
| 30–40
|- style="text-align:center; background:#bfb;"
| 71
| June 20
| Pirates
| W 6–3
| Jackson (5–7)
| Morton (4–8)
| Rondón (8)
| 36,423
| 31–40
|- style="text-align:center; background:#fbb;"
| 72
| June 21
| Pirates
| L 3–5
| Worley (1–0)
| Wood (7–6)
| Melancon (11)
| 36,563
| 31–41
|- style="text-align:center; background:#fbb;"
| 73
| June 22
| Pirates
| L 1–2
| Cumpton (3–2)
| Hammel (6–5)
| Melancon (12)
| 33,573
| 31–42
|- style="text-align:center; background:#fbb"
| 74
| June 23
| Reds
| L 1–6
| Broxton (3–0)
| Rondón (1–2)
| 
| 27,747
| 31–43
|- style="text-align:center; background:#bfb"
| 75
| June 24
| Reds
| W 7–3
| Arrieta (4–1)
| Bailey (7–4)
| —
| 28,226
| 32–43
|- style="text-align:center; background:#fbb"
| 76
| June 25
| Reds
| L 1–4
| Latos (1–0)
| Jackson (5–8)
| Chapman (14)
| 28,207
| 32–44
|- style="text-align:center; background:#bfb"
| 77
| June 26
| Nationals
| W 5–3
| Ramirez (1–1)
| Stammen (0–3)
| Rondón (9)
| 28,867
| 33–44
|- style="text-align:center; background:#bfb"
| 78
| June 27
| Nationals
| W 7–2
| Hammel (7–5)
| Roark (7–5)
| 
| 30,683
| 34–44
|- style="text-align:center; background:#fbb"
| 79
| June 28
| Nationals
| L 0–3
| Gonzalez (5–4)
| Beeler (0–1)
| Soriano (19)
| 35,770
| 34–45
|- style="text-align:center; background:#fbb"
| 80
| June 28
| Nationals
| L 2–7
| Treinen (1–3)
| Samardzija (2–7)
| Detwiler (1)
| 32,267
| 34–46
|- style="text-align:center; background:#bfb;"
| 81
| June 30
| @ Red Sox
| W 2–0
| Arrieta (5–1)
| Peavy (1–7)
| Rondon (10)
| 37,814
| 35–46
|-

|- style="text-align:center; background:#bfb;"
| 82
| July 1
| @ Red Sox
| W 2–1
| Strop (1–3) 
| Uehara (3–2)
| Rondón (11)
| 36,748
| 36–46
|- style="text-align:center; background:#bfb;"
| 83
| July 2
| @ Red Sox
| W 16–9
| Villanueva (4–5)
| Workman (1–2)
| 
| 37,055
| 37–46
|-  style="text-align:center; background:#bfb;"
| 84
| July 4
| @ Nationals
| W 7–2
| Hammel (8–5)
| Roark (7–6)
| 
| 41,274
| 38–46
|- style="text-align:center; background:#fbb"
| 85
| July 5
| @ Nationals
| L 0–13
| González (6–4)
| Villanueva (4–6)
| 
| 38,473
| 38–47
|- style="text-align:center; background:#fbb"
| 86
| July 6
| @ Nationals
| L 1–2
| Clippard (6–2)
| Strop (1–4)
| Soriano (21)
| 32,941
| 38–48
|- style="text-align:center; background:#fbb "
| 87
| July 7
| @ Reds
| L 3–9
| Leake (7–7)
| Jackson (5–9)
| 
| 26,558
| 38–49
|- style="text-align:center; background:#fbb "
| 88
| July 8
| @ Reds
| L 2–4
| Cueto (9–6)
| Wood (7–7)
| Chapman (18)
| 17,371
| 38–50
|- style="text-align:center; background:#fbb "
| 89
| July 8
| @ Reds
| L 5–6
| Ondrusek (3–2)
| Rondón (1–3)
| 
| 29,991
| 38–51
|- style="text-align:center; background:#fbb "
| 90
| July 9
| @ Reds
| L 1–4
| Simón (12–3)
| Beeler (0–2)
| Chapman (19)
| 32,810
| 38–52
|- style="text-align:center; background:#bfb "
| 91
| July 10
| @ Reds
| W 6–4
| Parker (1–0)
| Hoover (1–6)
| 
| 31,983
| 39–52
|- style="text-align:center; background:#bfb "
| 92
| July 11
| Braves
| W 5–4
| Rondón (2–3)
| Walden (0–1)
| 
| 39,544
| 40–52
|- style="text-align:center; background:#fbb "
| 93
| July 12
| Braves
| L 6–11
| Minor (3–5)
| Jackson (5–10)
| Carpenter (3)
| 36,806
| 40–53
|- style="text-align:center; background:#fbb "
| 94
| July 13
| Braves
| L 7–10
| Teherán (9–6)
| Wood (7–8)
| Kimbrel (29)
| 36,363
| 40–54
|- style="text-align:center; background:#bbcaff;"
| colspan="10" | 85th All-Star Game in Minneapolis, Minnesota 
|- style="text-align:center; background:#fbb"
| 95
| July 18
| @ Diamondbacks
| L 4–5
| De La Rosa (1–0)
| Schlitter (2–3)
| Reed (22)
| 32,619
| 40–55
|- style="text-align:center; background:#fbb"
| 96
| July 19
| @ Diamondbacks
| L 3–9
| Miley (6–6)
| Wood (7–9)
| 
| 32,528
| 40–56
|- style="text-align:center; background:#fbb"
| 97
| July 20
| @ Diamondbacks
| L 2–3
| Collmenter (8–5)
| Arrieta (5–2)
| Reed (23)
| 37,131
| 40–57
|- style="text-align:center; background:#bfb"
| 98
| July 22
| Padres
| W 6–0
| Hendricks (1–0)
| Stults (3–12)
| 
| 32,730
| 41–57
|- style="text-align:center; background:#fbb"
| 99
| July 23
| Padres
| L 3–8
| Kennedy (8–9)
| Wada (0–1)
| 
| 30,718
| 41–58
|- style="text-align:center; background:#fbb"
| 100
| July 24
| Padres
| L 3–13
| Ross (9–10)
| Jackson (5–11)
| 
| 31,321
| 41–59
|- style="text-align:center; background:#bfb"
| 101
| July 25
| Cardinals
| W 7–6
| Grimm (3–2)
| Siegrist (1–2)
| Rondón (12)
| 41,534
| 42–59
|- style="text-align:center; background:#fbb"
| 102
| July 26
| Cardinals
| L 3–6
| Choate (2–2)
| Russell (0–2)
| Rosenthal (31)
| 41,927
| 42–60
|- style="text-align:center; background:#fbb"
| 103
| July 27
| Cardinals
| L 0–1
| Wainwright (13–5)
| Hendricks (1–1)
| Rosenthal (32)
| 35,256
| 42–61
|- style="text-align:center; background:#bfb"
| 104
| July 28
| Rockies
| W 4–1
| Wada (1–1)
| Flande (0–3)
| Rondón (13)
| 29,702
| 43–61
|- style="text-align:center; background:#bfb"
| 105
| July 29
| Rockies
| W 4–3 (16)
| Baker (1–0)
| Matzek (2–5)
| 
| 28,590
| 44–61
|- style="text-align:center; background:#fbb "
| 106
| July 30
| Rockies
| L 4–6 (10)
| Scahill (1–0)
| Wright (0–2)
| Ottavino (1)
| 29,491
| 44–62
|- style="text-align:center; background:#bfb "
| 107
| July 31
| Rockies
| W 3–1
| Arrieta (6–2)
| Hernández (0–1)
| Rondón (14)
| 35,729
| 45–62
|-

|- style="text-align:center; background:#bfb "
| 108
| August 1
| @ Dodgers
| W 8–2
| Hendricks (2–1)
| Haren (8–9)
| 
| 47,900
| 46–62
|- style="text-align:center; background:#fbb "
| 109
| August 2
| @ Dodgers
| L 2–5 (12)
| Wright (4–2)
| Parker (1–1)
| 
| 53,354
| 46–63
|- style="text-align:center; background:#bfb "
| 110
| August 3
| @ Dodgers
| W 7–3
| Jackson (6–11)
| Beckett (6–6)
| 
| 44,713
| 47–63
|- style="text-align:center; background:#bfb "
| 111
| August 5
| @ Rockies
| W 6–5 (12)
| Rondón (3–3)
| Logan (2–2)
| Villanueva (2)
| 35,043
| 48–63
|- style="text-align:center; background:#fbb "
| 112
| August 6
| @ Rockies
| L 4–13
| Lyles (6–1)
| Arrieta (6–3)
| 
| 35,804
| 48–64
|- style="text-align:center; background:#bfb "
| 113
| August 7
| @ Rockies
| W 6–2
| Hendricks (3–1)
| Flande (0–4)
| 
| 32,585
| 49–64
|- style="text-align:center; background:#fbb "
| 114
| August 8
| Rays
| L 3–4
| Boxberger (3–1)
| Rondón (3–4)
| 
| 34,937
| 49–65
|- style="text-align:center; background:#fbb "
| 115
| August 9
| Rays
| L 0–4
| Odorizzi (8–9)
| Jackson (6–12)
| 
| 36,739
| 49–66
|- style="text-align:center; background:#bfb "
| 116
| August 10
| Rays
| W 3–2 (12)
| Villanueva (5–6)
| Ramos (2–4)
| 
| 33,039
| 50–66
|- style="text-align:center; background:#fbb "
| 117
| August 11
| Brewers
| L 1–3
| Gallardo (7–6)
| Arrieta (6–4)
| Rodríguez (36)
| 28,927
| 50–67
|- style="text-align:center; background:#bfb "
| 118
| August 12
| Brewers
| W 3–0
| Hendricks (4–1)
| Peralta (14–7)
| Rondón (15)
| 28,819
| 51–67
|- style="text-align:center; background:#bfb "
| 119
| August 13
| Brewers
| W 4–2
| Wada (2–1)
| Lohse (11–7)
| Rondón (16)
| 31,191
| 52–67
|- style="text-align:center; background:#fbb "
| 120
| August 14
| Brewers
| L 2–6
| Fiers (2–1)
| Jackson (6–13)
| 
| 38,157
| 52–68
|- style="text-align:center; background:#fbb "
| 121
| August 15
| @ Mets
| L 2–3
| Wheeler (8–8)
| Wood (7–10)
| Mejía (18)
| 25,016
| 52–69
|- style="text-align:center; background:#fbb "
| 122
| August 16
| @ Mets
| L 3–7
| Niese (7–8)
| Straily (1–3)
| 
| 30,744
| 52–70
|- style="text-align:center; background:#bfb "
| 123
| August 17
| @ Mets
| W 2–1
| Strop (2–4)
| Mejía (5–6)
| Rondon (17)
| 27,938
| 53–70
|- style="text-align:center; background:#bfb "
| 124
| August 18
| @ Mets
| W 4–1
| Hendricks (5–1)
| Carlyle (1–1)
| Rondon (18)
| 23,271
| 54–70
|- style="text-align:center; background:#bfb "
| 125
| August 19
| Giants
| W 2–1
| Wada (3–1)
| Vogelsong (7–9)
| Rondon (19)
| 31,064
| 55–70
|- style="text-align:center; background:#fbb "
| 126
| August 20
| Giants
| L 3–8
| Peavy (3–12)
| Jackson (6–14)
| 
| 30,633
| 55–71
|- style="text-align:center; background:#fbb "
| 127
| August 21
| Giants
| L 3–5
| Bumgarner (14–9)
| Wood (7–11)
| Casilla (11)
| 30,541
| 55–72
|- style="text-align:center; background:#bfb "
| 128
| August 22
| Orioles
| W 4–1
| Arrieta (7–4)
| Gausman (7–5)
| Rondon (20)
| 33,761
| 56–72
|- style="text-align:center; background:#bfb "
| 129
| August 23
| Orioles
| W 7–2
| Grimm (4–2)
| Norris (11–8)
| 
| 37,156
| 57–72
|- style="text-align:center; background:#bfb "
| 130
| August 24
| Orioles
| W 2–1
| Wada (4–1)
| Gonzalez (6–7)
| Rondon (21)
| 32,774
| 58–72
|- style="text-align:center; background:#bfb "
| 131
| August 26
| @ Reds
| W 3–0
| Wood (8-11)
| Cueto (15-8)
| Rondon (22)
| 19,481
| 59–72
|- style="text-align:center; background:#fbb "
| 132
| August 27
| @ Reds
| L 5–7
| Latos (5-3)
| Turner (4-8)
| Chapman (28)
| 20,497
| 59-73
|- style="text-align:center; background:#fbb "
| 133
| August 28
| @ Reds
| L 2–7
| Axelrod (1-0)
| Arrieta (7-5)
| 
| 21,316
| 59–74
|- style="text-align:center; background:#bfb "
| 134
| August 29
| @ Cardinals
| W 7–2
| Ramirez (2-1)
| Neshek (6-1)
| 
| 43,181
| 60–74
|- style="text-align:center; background:#bfb "
| 135
| August 30
| @ Cardinals
| W 5–1
| Doubront (1-0)
| Masterson (2-3)
| 
| 44,755
| 61–74
|- style="text-align:center; background:#fbb "
| 136
| August 30
| @ Cardinals
| L 13–2
| Gonzales (1-2)
| Wada (4-2)
| 
| 44,762
| 61–75
|- style="text-align:center; background:#fbb "
| 137
| August 31
| @ Cardinals
| L 9–6
| Neshek (7-1)
| Villanueva (5-7)
| Rosenthal (40)
| 45,148
| 61–76
|-

|- style="text-align:center; background:#bfb "
| 138
| September 1
| Brewers
| W 4–2
| Turner (5-8)
| Nelson (2-6)
| Rondon (23)
| 32,054
| 62–76
|- style="text-align:center; background:#bfb "
| 139
| September 2
| Brewers
| W 7–1
| Arrieta (8-5)
| Gallardo (8-8)
| 
| 28,434
| 63–76
|- style="text-align:center; background:#bfb "
| 140
| September 3
| Brewers
| W 6–2
| Hendricks (6–1)
| Garza (7–8)
| 
| 31,251
| 64–76
|- style="text-align:center; background:#fbb "
| 141
| September 5
| Pirates
| L 3–5 (11)
| Melancon (3–4)
| Wright (0–3)
| Holdzkom (1)
| 35,541
| 64–77
|- style="text-align:center; background:#fbb "
| 142
| September 6
| Pirates
| L 0–5
| Liriano (4–10)
| Doubront (3–5)
| 
| 36,867
| 64–78
|- style="text-align:center; background:#fbb "
| 143
| September 7
| Pirates
| L 4–10
| Cole (8–5)
| Wood (8–12)
| 
| 33,894
| 64–79
|- style="text-align:center; background:#fbb "
| 144
| September 8
| @ Blue Jays
| L 0–8
| Stroman (10–5)
| Turner (5–9)
| 
| 16,879
| 64–80
|- style="text-align:center; background:#fbb "
| 145
| September 9
| @ Blue Jays
| L 2–9
| Buehrle (12–9)
| Ramirez (2–2)
| 
| 17,903
| 64–81
|- style="text-align:center; background:#fbb "
| 146
| September 10
| @ Blue Jays
| L 1–11
| Hutchison (10–11)
| Hendricks (6–2)
| 
| 19,411
| 64–82
|- style="text-align:center; background:#fbb "
| 147
| September 12
| @ Pirates
| L 3–7
| Cole (9–5)
| Wada (4–3)
| 
| 35,638
| 64–83
|- style="text-align:center; background:#bfb "
| 148
| September 13
| @ Pirates
| W 6–4
| Doubront (4–5)
| Locke (7–5)
| Rondón (24)
| 38,024
| 65–83
|- style="text-align:center; background:#fbb "
| 149
| September 14
| @ Pirates
| L 3–7
| Vólquez (12-7)
| Turner (5-10)
| 
| 37,655
| 65-84
|- style="text-align:center; background:#bfb "
| 150
| September 15
| Reds
| W 1–0
| Rondón (4–4)
| Villarreal (0–1)
| 
| 33,144
| 66–84
|- style="text-align:center; background: #bfb "
| 151
| September 16
| Reds
| W 7–0
| Arrieta (9–5)
| Cueto (18–5)
| 
| 33,812
| 67–84
|- style="text-align:center; background: #bfb "
| 152
| September 17
| Reds
| W 3–1
| Hendricks (7–2)
| Corcino (0–1)
| Rondón (25)
| 33,500
| 68–84
|- style="text-align:center; background:#fbb "
| 153
| September 18
| Dodgers
| L 4–8
| Rodriguez (1–0)
| Ramirez (2–3)
| 
| 33,649
| 68–85
|- style="text-align:center; background:#fbb "
| 154
| September 19
| Dodgers
| L 5–14
| Kershaw (20–3)
| Jackson (6–15)
| 
| 33,322
| 68–86
|- style="text-align:center; background:#bfb "
| 155
| September 20
| Dodgers
| W 8–7
| Grimm (5–2)
| Wilson (2–4)
| Rondón (26)
| 34,334
| 69–86
|- style="text-align:center; background:#fbb "
| 156
| September 21
| Dodgers
| L 5–8
| Perez (1–3)
| Turner (5–11)
| Jansen (43)
| 31,933
| 69–87
|- style="text-align:center; background:#fbb "
| 157
| September 22
| Cardinals
| L 0–8
| Wainwright  (20–9)
| Wood (8–13)
| 
| 28,893
| 69–88
|- style="text-align:center; background:#bfb "
| 158
| September 23
| Cardinals
| W 4–3
| Rosscup (1–0)
| Neshek (7–2)
| 
| 29,754
| 70–88
|- style="text-align:center; background:#bfb "
| 159
| September 24
| Cardinals
| W 3–1
| Arrieta (10–5)
| Lackey (14–10)
| Rondón (27)
| 33,292
| 71–88
|- style="text-align:center; background:#bfb "
| 160
| September 26
| @ Brewers
| W 6–4
| Ramirez (3–3)
| Nelson (2–9)
| Rondón (28)
| 39,880
| 72–88
|- style="text-align:center; background: #fbb"
| 161
| September 27
| @ Brewers
| L 2–1
| Peralta (17–11)
| Wada (4–4)
| Rodríguez (44)
| 41,440
| 72–89
|- style="text-align:center; background:#bfb"
| 162
| September 28
| @ Brewers
| W 5–2
| Turner (6–11)
| Fiers (6–5)
| Rondón (29)
| 33,837
| 73–89
|-

|- style="text-align:center;"
| Legend:       = Win       = Loss       = PostponementBold = Cubs team member

Note: The Cubs finished their first winning season at Wrigley Field since 2009 with a record of 41–40.
2,652,113 fans attended Cubs home games which was the best since the 2008 season.

Transactions 
The Cubs traded Jason Hammel and Jeff Samardzija on July 5 to the Oakland A's for minor leaguers Addison Russell, Billy McKinney and major league pitcher Dan Straily. Russell was considered a top-five prospect in baseball.
On July 28, Darwin Barney was traded to the Los Angeles Dodgers for minor league pitcher Jonathan Martinez.
On July 30, the Cubs acquired Félix Doubront from the Boston Red Sox.
On July 31, pitcher James Russell and infielder Emilio Bonifacio were traded to the Atlanta Braves for 20-year-old catcher Victor Caratini.
On August 15, the Cubs traded outfielder Brett Jackson to the Arizona Diamondbacks for pitcher Blake Cooper.

Roster

Statistics

Batting
Note: G = Games played; AB = At bats; R = Runs scored; H = Hits; 2B = Doubles; 3B = Triples; HR = Home runs; Avg. = Batting average; RBI = Runs batted in; SB = Stolen bases

Source

Pitching
Note: W = Wins; L = Losses; ERA = Earned run average; G = Games pitched; GS = Games started; SV = Saves; IP = Innings pitched; R = Runs allowed; ER = Earned runs allowed; BB = Walks allowed; K = Strikeouts

Source

Team

Scoring by inning

Source: Baseball-Reference

Awards and honors
Major League Baseball All-Star Game
Starlin Castro
Jeff Samardzija
Anthony Rizzo

Branch Rickey Award
Anthony Rizzo

Major League Baseball draft 
During the draft, the Cubs drafted Kyle Schwarber with the fourth overall pick of the 2014 Draft who would play an important role in the 2016 World Series.

Farm system
LEAGUE CHAMPIONS: Kane County
On September 16, 2014 the Cubs announced that they will be moving their top Class A affiliate from Daytona in the Florida State League to Myrtle Beach in the Carolina League for the 2015 season. Two days later, on the 18th, the Cubs signed a 4-year player development contract with the South Bend Silver Hawks of the Midwest League, ending their brief relationship with the Kane County Cougars. On the 25th, the Silver Hawks officially changed their name to the South Bend Cubs.

References

External links

Chicago Cubs schedule for the 2014 season
 2014 Chicago Cubs season at ESPN
2014 Chicago Cubs season at Baseball Reference

Chicago Cubs
Cubs
Chicago Cubs seasons